Timothy Coughlin (January 8, 1834 – August 12, 1912) was a farmer and political figure in Ontario. He represented Middlesex North from 1878 to 1891 in the House of Commons of Canada as a Liberal-Conservative member.

He was born in Yarmouth Township, Upper Canada, the son of Daniel Coughlin and Mary Regan, Irish immigrants. Coughlin moved with his family to Stephen Township in 1846. He served as treasurer and then reeve for Stephen Township. In 1870, he married Mary Ann Glavin.

His son John Joseph later became a lawyer and judge.

References 
 
The History of Stephen Township (1992) Mack, SM pp. 366–7
The Canadian parliamentary companion, 1889 JA Gemmill

1834 births
1912 deaths
Members of the House of Commons of Canada from Ontario
Conservative Party of Canada (1867–1942) MPs
People from Elgin County